Ocroeme tricolor is a species of beetle in the family Cerambycidae. It was described by Martins in 1980.

References

Oemini
Beetles described in 1980